Regional elections were held in Denmark on 8 March 1966.  10005 municipal council members were elected to the 1 April 1966 - 31 March 1970 term of office in more than 1,100 municipalities, as well as 303 members of the 25 counties of Denmark.

Results of regional elections
The results of the regional elections:

County Councils

Municipal Councils

References

1966
Denmark
Elections
Danish local elections